"Waiting for the Night" is a song by Dutch DJ and record producer Armin van Buuren. It features vocals and lyrics from Australian singer and songwriter Fiora. The song was released in the Netherlands by Armind as a digital download on 21 January 2013. It was chosen as the main theme song to the Dutch movie Loving Ibiza (Verliefd op Ibiza). It is the first single from van Buuren's fifth album Intense.

Music video 
A music video to accompany the track was released to YouTube on 29 January 2013. It contains scenes taken from the movie Loving Ibiza, starring Armin van Buuren mixing in a Ibiza club.

Track listing 
 Digital download 
 "Waiting for the Night" (radio edit) – 3:04
 "Waiting for the Night" (extended mix) – 4:29
 "Waiting for the Night" (Beat Service remix) - 7:28
 "Waiting for the Night" (Beat Service remix edit) - 3:48
 "Waiting for the Night" (Beat Service dub) - 6:27
 "Waiting for the Night" (Clinton VanSciver extended mix) - 4:33
 "Waiting for the Night" (Clinton VanSciver radio edit) - 2:57

Charts

References

2013 singles
Armin van Buuren songs
2013 songs
Songs written by Armin van Buuren
Armada Music singles
Songs written by Benno de Goeij